Murovani Kurylivtsi Raion was one of raions of Vinnytsia Oblast, located in southwestern Ukraine. The administrative center of the raion was the urban-type settlement of Murovani Kurylivtsi. The raion was abolished on 18 July 2020 as part of the administrative reform of Ukraine, which reduced the number of raions of Vinnytsia Oblast to six. The area of Murovani Kurylivtsi Raion was merged into Mohyliv-Podilskyi Raion. The last estimate of the raion population was

History
The area historically was a part of the Kingdom of Poland. Murovani Kurylivtsi is first mentioned in 1453. In 1793, after the Second Partition of Poland, it was transferred to the Russian Empire. In Russia, it was a part of Ushitsky Uyezd of Podolia Governorate. On January 31, 1923 uyezds were abolished. The Ukrainian Soviet Socialist Republic was established, and Murovani Kurylivtsi became the administrative center of the newly established Murovani Kurylivtsi Raion, which was a part of Mohyliv-Podilskyi Okruha. In 1925, the governorate was abolished, and okruhas were directly subordinated to Ukrainian SSR. In 1930, okruhas were abolished as well, and on February 27, 1932 Vinnytsia Oblast was established. In 1962, the raion was abolished, and in 1966, it was re-established. In 1991, the Soviet Union was abolished, and Murovani Kurylivtsi became a part of independent Ukraine.

References

Former raions of Vinnytsia Oblast
States and territories established in 1923
States and territories disestablished in 1962
States and territories established in 1966
1923 establishments in Ukraine
Ukrainian raions abolished during the 2020 administrative reform